Sulawesi has a high degree of endemism in its bird species. Sulawesi supports twelve endemic bird genera.

Conservation status

Bucerotiformes

Bucerotidae
 Penelopides exarhatus (Sulawesi hornbill) - VU
 Rhyticeros cassidix (knobbed hornbill) - VU

Caprimulgiformes

Caprimulgidae
 Caprimulgus celebensis (Sulawesi nightjar) - LC
 Eurostopodus diabolicus (Sulawesi eared-nightjar) - VU

Charadriiformes

Scolopacidae
 Scolopax celebensis (Sulawesi woodcock) - NT

Columbiformes

Columbidae
 Gallicolumba tristigmata (Sulawesi ground dove) - LC
 Turacoena manadensis (white-faced cuckoo-dove) - LC
 Ptilinopus fischeri (red-eared fruit-dove) - LC
 Ptilinopus epia (maroon-chinned fruit-dove) - NT
 Ducula forsteni (white-bellied imperial pigeon) - LC
 Ducula luctuosa (silver-tipped imperial pigeon) - LC
 Ducula radiata (grey-headed imperial pigeon) - LC
 Cryptophaps poecilorrhoa (sombre pigeon) - LC

Coraciiformes

Alcedinidae
 Actenoides monachus (green-backed kingfisher) - NT
 Actenoides princeps (scaly kingfisher) - LC
 Cittura cyanotis (lilac-cheeked kingfisher) - NT
 Ceyx fallax (Sulawesi kingfisher) - NT
 Pelargopsis melanorhyncha (great-billed kingfisher) - LC
 Todiramphus enigma (Talaud kingfisher) - NT

Meropidae
 Meropogon forsteni (purple-bearded bee-eater) - LC
 Coracias temminckii (purple-winged roller) - LC

Piciformes
 Dendrocopos temminckii (Sulawesi pygmy woodpecker) - LC
 Mulleripicus fulvus (ashy woodpecker) - LC

Craciformes

Megapodiidae
 Macrocephalon maleo (maleo) - EN
 Megapodius bernsteinii (Sula scrubfowl) - NT

Cuculiformes

Cuculidae
 Cuculus crassirostris (Sulawesi hawk-cuckoo) - LC
 Centropus celebensis (bay coucal) - LC
 Eudynamys melanorhynchus (black-billed koel) - LC
 Phaenicophaeus calyorhynchus (yellow-billed malkoha) - LC

Falconiformes

Accipitridae
 Spilornis rufipectus (Sulawesi serpent eagle) - LC
 Accipiter griseiceps (Sulawesi goshawk) - LC
 Accipiter nanus (small sparrowhawk) - NT
 Accipiter rhodogaster (vinous-breasted sparrowhawk) - LC
 Accipiter trinotatus (spot-tailed sparrowhawk) - LC

Gruiformes

Rallidae
 Aramidopsis plateni (snoring rail) - VU
 Amaurornis isabellina (isabelline bush-hen) - LC
 Amaurornis magnirostris (Talaud bush-hen) - VU
 Gymnocrex rosenbergii (blue-faced rail) - VU
 Gymnocrex talaudensis (Talaud rail) - EN

Passeriformes

Artamidae
 Artamus monachus (ivory-backed woodswallow) - LC

Campephagidae
 Coracina temminckii (cerulean cuckoo-shrike) - LC
 Coracina bicolor (pied cuckoo-shrike) - NT
 Coracina abbotti (pygmy cuckoo-shrike) - LC
 Coracina schistacea (slaty cuckoo-shrike) - LC
 Coracina morio (Sulawesi cicadabird) - LC
 Coracina leucopygia (white-rumped cuckoo-shrike) - LC
 Lalage leucopygialis (white-rumped triller) - LC

Corvidae
 Corvus unicolor (Banggai crow) - CR
 Corvus typicus (piping crow) - LC

Dicaeidae
 Dicaeum nehrkorni (crimson-crowned flowerpecker) - LC
 Dicaeum celebicum (grey-sided flowerpecker) - LC
 Dicaeum aureolimbatum (yellow-sided flowerpecker) - LC

Dicruridae
 Dicrurus montanus (Sulawesi drongo) - LC

Meliphagidae
 Myza celebensis (dark-eared myza) - LC
 Myza sarasinorum (white-eared myza) - LC
 Myzomela chloroptera (Sulawesi myzomela) - LC

Monarchidae
 Hypothymis puella (pale-blue monarch) - LC

Muscicapidae
 Ficedula rufigula (rufous-throated flycatcher) - NT
 Ficedula bonthaina (Lompobattang flycatcher) - EN
 Cyornis sanfordi (Matinan flycatcher) - EN
 Cyornis hoevelli (blue-fronted flycatcher) - LC
 Cyornis omissus (Sulawesi blue-flycatcher) - LC
 Muscicapa sodhii (Sulawesi streaked flycatcher)

Nectariniidae
 Aethopyga duyvenbodei (elegant sunbird) - EN

Pachycephalidae
 Hylocitrea bonensis (olive-flanked whistler) - LC
 Coracornis raveni (maroon-backed whistler) - LC
 Coracornis sanghirensis (Sangihe shrikethrush) - CR
 Pachycephala sulfuriventer (sulphur-bellied whistler) - LC

Pellorneidae
 Trichastoma celebense (Sulawesi babbler) - LC

Phylloscopidae
 Phylloscopus sarasinorum (Sulawesi leaf-warbler) - LC

Rhipiduridae
 Eutrichomyias rowleyi (cerulean flycatcher) - CR
 Rhipidura teysmanni (Sulawesi fantail) - LC

Timaliidae
 Malia grata (malia) - LC

Turdidae
 Zoothera erythronota (red-backed thrush) - NT
 Zoothera heinrichi (Sulawesi mountain-thrush) - NT
 Zoothera mendeni (red-and-black thrush) - NT
 Cataponera turdoides (Sulawesi thrush) - LC
 Heinrichia calligyna (great shortwing) - LC

Sturnidae
 Basilornis celebensis (Sulawesi myna) - LC
 Streptocitta albicollis (white-necked myna) - LC
 Streptocitta albertinae (bare-eyed myna) - NT
 Enodes erythrophris (fiery-browed myna) - LC
 Scissirostrum dubium (finch-billed myna) - LC
 Acridotheres cinereus (pale-bellied myna) - LC

Zosteropidae
 Zosterops consobrinorum (pale-bellied white-eye) - LC
 Zosterops anomalus (lemon-throated white-eye) - LC
 Zosterops atrifrons (black-crowned white-eye) - LC
 Zosterops nehrkorni (Sangihe white-eye) - CR
 Zosterops somadikartai (Sangihe white-eye) - NT
 Lophozosterops squamiceps (streaky-headed white-eye) - LC

Psittaciformes

Psittacidae
 Loriculus exilis (red-billed hanging-parrot) - NT
 Loriculus stigmatus (great hanging parrot) - LC
 Loriculus catamene (Sangihe hanging parrot) - NT
 Loriculus sclateri (Sula hanging parrot) - LC

Psittaculidae
 Saudareos meyeri (yellow-cheeked lorikeet) - LC
 Trichoglossus ornatus (ornate lorikeet) - LC
 Prioniturus flavicans (yellowish-breasted racquet-tail) - NT
 Prioniturus platurus (golden-mantled racquet-tail) - LC
 Eos histrio (red-and-blue lory) - EN

Strigiformes

Strigidae
 Ninox ochracea (ochre-bellied hawk-owl) - NT
 Ninox ios (cinnabar boobook) - VU
 Ninox punctulata (speckled boobook) - LC
 Ninox burhani (Togian hawk-owl) - NT
 Otus collari (Sangihe scops owl) - LC
 Otus siaoensis (Siau scops owl) - CR
 Otus manadensis (Sulawesi scops owl) - LC

Tytonidae
 Tyto inexspectata (Sulawesi golden owl) - VU
 Tyto rosenbergii (Sulawesi owl) - LC
 Tyto nigrobrunnea (Taliabu masked owl) - EN

See also 
 Fauna of Indonesia
 Fauna of New Guinea
 Lists of birds by region
 List of birds of Indonesia
 List of birds of Indonesia (non-passerine)
 List of birds of Indonesia (passerine)
 Endemic birds of Indonesia

Notes

References
 Birdlife International, The World List of Threatened Birds, 
 Birdlife International, Endemic Bird Areas of the World, 
 Morten Strange, A Photographic Guide to the Birds of Indonesia, 
 Periplus Ac+ion Guides, Birding Indonesia, 
 The Howard and Moore, Complete Checklist of the Birds of the World, 
 BirdLife International (2012) Endemic Bird Area factsheet: Sulawesi. 21/07/2012

External links 
 BirdLife International species index website
 IUCN Red List — all species + locations website

 
Sulawesi, endemic
Birds, Sulawesi
Sulawesi